Pawsey may refer to:

People 
 Charles Pawsey (1894–1972), British colonial administrator
 Charles Pawsey (rugby league) (born 1923), English rugby player
 Jim Pawsey (born 1933), British politician
 Joseph Lade Pawsey (1908–1962), Australian scientist
 Ken Pawsey (born 1940), Australian ice hockey player
 Mark Pawsey (born 1957), British politician

Other uses 
 Pawsey (crater)
 Pawsey Supercomputing Centre, in Perth, Western Australia

See also
 Pawsey Medal